Vítězná křídla is a Czech drama film. It was released in 1950.

External links
 

1950s Czech-language films
1950 films
Czechoslovak drama films
1950 drama films
Czechoslovak black-and-white films
1950s Czech films